Datuk Seri Razali bin Ibrahim (born 14 October 1970) is a Malaysian politician who served as the Member of Parliament (MP) for the Muar for three consecutive terms from March 2004 to his defeat to Syed Saddiq in the general election in May 2018. He is a member of the Supreme Council of the United Malays National Organisation (UMNO), a component party in the ruling Barisan Nasional (BN) coalition. Previously, he was the Deputy Minister in the Prime Minister's Department in the BN administration under former Prime Minister Najib Razak from May 2013 to May 2018 for 5 years.

Politics
Razali was elected to the Parliament in the 2004 general election. He was reelected again in the 2008 general election. In April 2009, he was appointed as Deputy Minister for Youth and Sports in the government of Najib Razak. In the 2013 general election he was returned to Parliament. His margin of victory was reduced significantly by a drop in ethnic Chinese support for BN from the Muar electorate which was approximately 35% Chinese. He remained a deputy minister after the election, although was shifted to the Prime Minister's Department. Later in 2013 he vacated his post as the deputy chief of UMNO's youth wing due to his age, and won election to the 25-member Supreme Council of the full party. In the 2018 general election he lost and failed to retain his parliamentary seat. Razali's defeat was despite the former Deputy Prime Minister Ahmad Zahid Hamidi purposely campaign trail to Muar a day before polling day during which Zahid had quipped in full confident that he "might as well go jump into the well if he loses" in dismissing reports of BN possibly losing the seat.

Election results

Honours

Honours of Malaysia
  :
  Knight Companion of the Order of the Crown of Pahang (DIMP) – Dato' (2008)
  :
  Knight Commander of the Exalted Order of Malacca (DCSM) – Datuk Wira (2017)
  :
  Grand Commander of the Order of the Territorial Crown (SMW) – Datuk Seri (2018)

See also
Muar (federal constituency)

References

External links
 

Living people
1970 births
People from Muar
People from Johor
Malaysian people of Malay descent
Malaysian Muslims
20th-century Malaysian lawyers
United Malays National Organisation politicians
Members of the Dewan Rakyat
MARA Junior Science College alumni
National University of Malaysia alumni
21st-century Malaysian politicians